Ptosis (from the Greek: πτῶσις 'falling', 'a fall', 'dropped') refers to droopiness or abnormal downward displacement of a body part or organ. Particular cases include:

 Ptosis (eyelid)
 Ptosis (chin)
 Ptosis (breasts)
 Visceroptosis, of the abdominal viscera
 Gastroptosis,  of the stomach
 Nephroptosis, of the kidney

See also
 Prolapse, a condition in which organs fall down or slip out of place
 Proptosis, or Exophthalmos